Krimpen aan de Lek is a town on the Lek River in the municipality of Krimpenerwaard, province of South Holland, the Netherlands. It had 6,607 inhabitants in 2008.

The name Krimpen comes from the archaic word "Krempener", meaning "river crossing". Therefore, Krimpen aan de Lek means "Crossing on the Lek".

Krimpen aan de Lek is a quiet and scenic village with 3 elementary schools.

Krimpen aan de Lek was a separate municipality until 1985, when it merged with Lekkerkerk to create the new municipality of Nederlek.

Gallery

References

Populated places in South Holland
Former municipalities of South Holland
Krimpenerwaard